Wakathuni is a small Aboriginal community, located 20 km south east of Tom Price in the Pilbara region of Western Australia, within the Shire of Ashburton.

Native title 

The community is located within the registered Yinhawangka Part A (WAD340/2010) native title claim area.

Governance 

The community is managed through its incorporated body, Wakuthuni Aboriginal Corporation, incorporated under the Aboriginal Councils and Associations Act 1976 on 28 November 1991.

Town planning 

Wakathuni Layout Plan No.1 has been prepared in accordance with State Planning Strategy 3.2 Aboriginal Settlements. Layout Plan No.1 was endorsed by on 6 July 2001 and the Western Australian Planning Commission on 2 October 2001.

References

External links 
 Office of the Registrar of Indigenous Corporations
 Native Title Claimant application summary

Towns in Western Australia
Aboriginal communities in Pilbara